Rue de Miromesnil is a street in the 8th arrondissement of Paris. It begins at rue du Faubourg-Saint-Honoré at the level of place Beauvau and ends at boulevard de Courcelles.

8th arrondissement of Paris